The non-marine molluscs of Hungary are a part of the molluscan fauna of Hungary (wildlife of Hungary). A number of species of non-marine molluscs are found in the wild in Hungary.

Freshwater gastropods

Neritidae
 Theodoxus danubialis (C. Pfeiffer, 1828)
 Theodoxus fluviatilis (Linnaeus, 1758)
 Theodoxus prevostianus (Pfeiffer, 1828)

Viviparidae
 Viviparus acerosus (Bourguignat, 1862)
 Viviparus contectus (Millet, 1813)

Thiaridae
 Esperiana daudebartii (Prevost, 1821)
 Esperiana esperi (Férussac, 1823)
 Melanoides tuberculatus (O. F. Müller, 1774)

Hydrobiidae
 Potamopyrgus antipodarum (Gray, 1843)

Lithoglyphidae
 Lithoglyphus naticoides (C. Pfeiffer, 1828)

Bithyniidae
 Bithynia tentaculata (Linnaeus, 1758)

Acroloxidae
 Acroloxus lacustris (Rossmässler, 1838)

Valvatidae
 Borysthenia naticina (Menke, 1845)
 Valvata cristata O. F. Müller, 1774
 Valvata piscinalis (O. F. Müller, 1774)

Lymnaeidae
 Galba truncatula (O. F. Müller, 1774)
 Lymnaea stagnalis (Linnaeus, 1758)
 Radix auricularia (Linnaeus, 1758)
 Radix balthica (Linnaeus, 1758)
 Radix labiata (Rossmässler, 1835)

Physidae
 Haitia acuta (Draparnaud, 1805)
 Physa fontinalis (Linnaeus, 1758)

Planorbidae
 Ancylus fluviatilis O.F. Müller, 1774
 Anisus spirorbis (Linnaeus, 1758)
 Anisus vortex (Linnaeus, 1758)
 Anisus vorticulus (Troschel, 1834)
 Bathyomphalus contortus (Linnaeus, 1758)
 Ferrissia wautieri (Mirolli, 1960)
 Gyraulus albus (O. F. Müller, 1774)
 Gyraulus crista (Linnaeus, 1758)
 Hippeutis complanatus (Linnaeus, 1758)
 Planorbarius corneus (Linnaeus, 1758)
 Segmentina nitida (O.F. Müller, 1774)

Land gastropods

Pomatiidae
 Pomatias elegans (O.F. Müller, 1774)
 Pomatias rivularis (Eichwald, 1829)

Aciculidae
 Platyla banatica (Roßmäßler, 1842)

Zonitidae
 Aegopinella nitens (Michaud, 1831)

Clausiliidae
 Balea stabilis (Pfeiffer, 1847)
 Cochlodina fimbriata (Rossmässler, 1835)
 Macrogastra borealis (Boettger, 1878)
 Macrogastra densestriata (Rossmässler, 1836)
 Pseudofusulus varians (C. Pfeiffer, 1828)

Discidae
 Discus ruderatus (Férussac, 1821)

Vitrinidae
 Oligolimax annularis (Studer, 1820)

Valloniidae
 Vallonia enniensis (Gredler, 1856)

Vertiginidae
 Vertigo angustior Jeffreys, 1830
 Vertigo moulinsiana (Dupuy, 1849)
 Vertigo substriata (Jeffreys, 1833)

Oxychilidae
 Daudebardia brevipes (Draparnaud, 1805)
 Oxychilus draparnaudi (Beck, 1837)
 Oxychilus hydatinus (Rossmässler, 1838)

Agriolimacidae
 Krynickillus melanocephalus Kaleniczenko, 1851

Milacidae
 Tandonia kusceri (H. Wagner, 1931)

Arionidae
 Arion vulgaris Moquin-Tandon, 1855

Hygromiidae
 Xerocampylaea erjaveci (Brusina, 1870)
 Kovacsia kovacsi (Varga & L. Pintér, 1972)

Helicidae
 Chilostoma cingulatum (S. Studer, 1820)
 Drobacia banatica (Rossmässler, 1838)
 Faustina faustina (Rossmässler, 1835)
 Faustina illyrica (Stabille, 1884)
 Helix pomatia (Linnaeus, 1758)

Freshwater bivalves

Corbiculidae
 Corbicula fluminalis (O. F. Müller, 1774)
 Corbicula fluminea (O. F. Müller, 1774)

Dreissenidae
 Dreissena polymorpha (Pallas, 1771)
 Dreissena rostriformis bugensis Andrusov, 1897

Sphaeriidae
 Musculium lacustre (O. F. Müller, 1774)
 Pisidium amnicum (O. F. Müller, 1774)
 Pisidium casertanum (Poli, 1791)
 Pisidium henslowanum (Sheppard, 1823)
 Pisidium moitessierianum Paladilhe, 1866
 Pisidium nitidum Jenyns, 1832
 Pisidium personatum Malm, 1855
 Pisidium subtruncatum Malm, 1855
 Pisidium supinum A. Schmidt, 1851
 Sphaerium corneum (Linnaeus, 1758)
 Sphaerium rivicola (Lamarck, 1818)
 Sphaerium solidum (Normand, 1844)

Unionidae
 Anodonta anatina (Linnaeus, 1758)
 Pseudanodonta complanata (Rossmässler, 1835)
 Sinanodonta woodiana (Lea, 1834)
 Unio crassus Philipsson, 1788
 Unio pictorum (Linnaeus, 1758)
 Unio tumidus Philipsson, 1788

See also

Lists of molluscs of surrounding countries:
 List of non-marine molluscs of Austria
 List of non-marine molluscs of Slovakia
 List of non-marine molluscs of Ukraine
 List of non-marine molluscs of Romania
 List of non-marine molluscs of Serbia
 List of non-marine molluscs of Croatia
 List of non-marine molluscs of Slovenia

References

Molluscs
Hungary
Hungary